St Aidan's Church of England Academy is a coeducational secondary school with academy status, located in Darlington, County Durham, England.

Originally Eastbourne Comprehensive School, school converted to academy status and was renamed Eastbourne Church of England Academy. The school was later renamed St Aidan's Church of England Academy.

The new academy building was built on Hundens Park, to the north of the original school site.

Notable former pupils

Eastbourne Comprehensive School
Tom Sawyer, Baron Sawyer, trade unionist and Labour Party politician
Vic Reeves, comedian
Andrew Fothergill, cricketer

St Aidan's Church of England Academy 
Alex Pattison, footballer

Change in leadership
In February 2015, principal Catherine McCoy and assistant principal Stephanie Francom stood down after a very negative Ofsted report, citing personal health concerns. Nicole Gibbon became principal and oversaw the Academy achieving an Ofsted "Good" rating.

In December 2021, Nicole Gibbon stepped down, with Anthony Martin, former Deputy Principal, becoming Acting Principal until the end of the year. In July 2022, Dean Lythgoe was appointed Headteacher, the first time since the Academy's conversion from "Eastbourne" that the term was used, rather than Principal.

Honours

 2018 Darlington 7-a-side Football Cup Winners
 2019 Durham Schools' Rugby Finals Runners Up
 2019 Darlington Schools' Cricket Finals Runners Up
 2020 Mountain Biking Regional Finals, 3rd Place.
 2021 Year 7 Football Town Cup Runners-Up
 2022 Year 7 Football Town Cup Winners
 2022 Robotics North East Championships, 3rd Place.

References

External links 
 St Aidan's CofE Academy Website
 St Aidan's CE Academy Facebook Page
 St Aidan's CE Academy Instagram 
 Darlington council plans

Academies in the Borough of Darlington
Church of England secondary schools in the Diocese of Durham
Secondary schools in the Borough of Darlington
Schools in Darlington